Fred Simms (6 March 1929 – 3 February 1997) was an  Australian rules footballer who played with South Melbourne in the Victorian Football League (VFL).

Notes

External links 

1929 births
1997 deaths
Australian rules footballers from Victoria (Australia)
Sydney Swans players